University of Bouira or Akli Mohand Oulhadj University of Bouira (is a university located in  Algeria in the Bouira. It was established in 2005.

See also 
 M'hamed Bougara University of Boumerdès
 List of universities in Algeria

References

External links
 Official website

2005 establishments in Algeria
Bouira
Buildings and structures in Bouïra Province